is a Japanese track and field athlete. He competed in the men's high jump at the 1996 Summer Olympics.

References

1975 births
Living people
Place of birth missing (living people)
Japanese male high jumpers
Olympic male high jumpers
Olympic athletes of Japan
Athletes (track and field) at the 1996 Summer Olympics
Japan Championships in Athletics winners
20th-century Japanese people
21st-century Japanese people